Louise Garfield is a Canadian performance artist, choreographer, film and television producer and arts administrator. Her work as a producer includes the films Zero Patience in which she has a cameo role playing a virus, and The Hanging Garden, for which she received a Genie Award nomination for Best Motion Picture.

She began her career in the arts as a choreographer and as a member of the feminist performance art trio The Clichettes. She later served as executive director of Arts Etobicoke in Toronto from 2004 to 2018.

References

External links

Film producers from Ontario
Canadian television producers
Canadian women television producers
Living people
Year of birth missing (living people)
Canadian women film producers
Canadian Film Centre alumni
Canadian performance artists
Women performance artists